M.A.X. 2: Mechanized Assault & Exploration (known in Europe as M.A.X. 2: Mechanised Assault & Exploration), or simply M.A.X. 2, is a 1998 hybrid real-time/turn-based strategy video game developed and published by Interplay Productions. It's a sequel to Mechanized Assault & Exploration.

Reception

The game received mixed reviews according to the review aggregation website GameRankings. Next Generation, however, said, "Will the new M.A.X. satisfy die-hard fans of the original? Probably not. Some players may be hoping for more than the new game delivers. But with or without die-hards, M.A.X. 2 is a solid combat/strategy game that is bound to make numerous new friends."

References

External links

1998 video games
Interplay Entertainment games
Real-time strategy video games
Turn-based strategy video games
Video game sequels
Windows games
Windows-only games
Multiplayer hotseat games
Video games developed in the United States